The Nineteenth Legislature of the Territory of Hawaii was a session of the Hawaii Territorial Legislature.  The session convened in Honolulu, Hawaii, and ran from February 17 until April 28, 1937.

Legislative session
The session ran from February 17 until April 28, 1937. It passed 247 bills into law.

Senators

House of Representatives

References

Notes

Hawaii legislative sessions
1937 in Hawaii